Myron Fass (March 29, 1926 - September 14, 2006) was an American publisher of pulp magazines and comic books, operating from the 1950s through the 1990s under a multitude of company names, including M. F. Enterprises and Eerie Publications. At his height in the 1970s, Fass was known as the biggest multi-title newsstand magazine publisher in the country. He put out up to fifty titles a month, many of them one-offs, covering any subject matter he thought would sell, from soft-core pornography to professional wrestling, UFOs to punk rock, horror films to firearm magazines.

Biography

Early life 
Fass was born in Brooklyn, New York, the son of an Orthodox Jewish laborer.

Comics artist 
Starting in 1948 and until the mid-1950s shrinkage of the industry initiated by the institution of the Comics Code, Fass illustrated horror, crime, romance, Western, and other comics for a multitude of publishers, including Ace Periodicals, Avon Comics, Charlton Comics, Fawcett Comics, Feature Comics, Fox Comics, Lev Gleason Publications, Magazine Enterprises, Marvel Comics, Story Comics, Street & Smith Comics, and Trojan Comics. Fass produced some of this material with the S. M. Iger Studio from 1949–1953. For Toby Press, Fass was a regular artist on Dr. Anthony King, Hollywood Love Doctor, Great Lover Romances, John Wayne Adventure Comics, Tales of Horror, and War.

Publisher 
In 1956, Fass packaged the Whitestone Publishing title Lunatickle, one of the first imitators of EC's Mad magazine. (Fass was a huge admirer of EC publisher William Gaines.)  The girlie magazine Foto-Rama and the monster magazine Shock Tales soon followed.

Backed by William Harris, who invented the Harris Press (still used today), by the beginning of the 1960s Fass was publishing his own material under the company name Tempest Publications. It was during this period that Fass launched the pin-up girlie mags Pic, Buccaneer, Poorboy, and Jaguar. Other Tempest publications were the "newspaper magazine" Quick, Companion, and the over-the-top tabloid National Mirror. Al Goldstein worked for Fass in 1968 before starting Screw magazine, writing for the National Mirror, the new tabloid Hush-Hush News, and the digest-sized girlie titles Pic and Bold.

In 1966 William Harris's son Stanley R. Harris partnered with Fass to form the black-and-white horror magazine publisher Eerie Publications. Eerie's output was a low-rent response to the popularity of the Warren Publishing horror comic magazines Creepy and Eerie. Fass's titles, all of which featured grisly, lurid color covers, included Weird, Horror Tales, Terror Tales, Tales from the Tomb, Tales of Voodoo, and Witches' Tales. Fass's brother Irving worked as an art director, and an old collaborator from the Iger studio days, Robert W. Farrell, had the title of publisher.

Eerie stayed in business until 1981, although co-owner Harris left in 1976 after a series of disputes with the mercurial Fass. Harris immediately went on to form the consumer magazine publisher Harris Publications.

Also in 1966, Fass formed M. F. Enterprises, a four-color comic publisher whose main product was Captain Marvel, a short-lived attempt by Golden Age cartoonist Carl Burgos, to revive the long-dormant Fawcett Comics superhero in slightly different form. M. F. Enterprises also published an Archie-style teen humor comic and a western series. M. F. Enterprises only published comics for two years, though Fass continued to use the company name for his magazines.

In the 1970s, under the company name Countrywide Publications, Fass began producing more one-shots and pushing even further the boundaries of good taste, with magazines on such topics as the Kennedy assassination, Elvis Presley's death, and the shooting of Hustler publisher Larry Flynt. As such, Fass was responsible for almost every bottom-of-the barrel publication to come out in the decade. If any sleaze or exploitation magazine was successful enough, his company would imitate it — often multiple times. If anybody was famous, he published a quickie magazine to cash in on their fame. Fass's standard of success was 20,000 copies sold per issue. During this period, Fass was known to wear a loaded gun to work. He lived in New Jersey with his wife Phyllis and an assortment of luxury automobiles.

By the mid-1980s Fass had become increasingly erratic, both in his behavior and publishing output. He moved to Ocala, Florida, where he ran a gun shop and continued to publish (mostly firearm-related) magazines. During this period, Fass published under the name CFV Publishers and called himself "Chief Merion Riley-Foss." His son David worked with him.

In the mid-1990s, Fass and his son David were still in Florida publishing gun magazines and other titles under the company name Creative Arts. According to former employee Jeff Goodman, by this time Fass was showing signs of paranoia and would not talk to anyone.

Death 
Fass died in 2006, in Fort Lauderdale, Florida.

Tributes 
Kurt Busiek's Astro City series features an homage to Fass in its Fass Gardens location.

Titles published

Comic books and magazines 
 Captain Marvel (1966)
 Captain Marvel Presents the Terrible 5 (1966)
 Gasm (5 issues, 1977–1978) — Heavy Metal knockoff
 Horror Tales (1969–1979)
 Tales from the Tomb  (1969–1975)
 Tales of Voodoo  (1968–1974)
 Terror Tales (1969–1979) — revival of 1930s pulp magazine published by Popular Publications
 Weird (1966–1981)
 Witches' Tales (1969–1975)

Crime 
 Homicide Detective
 Murder Squad Detective
 Son of Sam
 The World of Sherlock Holmes
 True Sex Crimes

Firearms 
 .44 Mag / .44 and Magnum
 GunPro (launched mid-1980s)
 Shooting Bible
 Shotgun Journal
 USA Guns (launched mid-1980s)

Men's magazines 
 Bold
 Brute
 Buccaneer
 Companion
 Flick
 Jaguar
 Pic
 Poorboy

Monster magazines 
 Shock Tales (launched 1959)
 Thriller (3 issues, 1962)

Movies and TV 
 Movie Lies
 Movie TV Secrets
 PhotoTV Land
 TV Photo Story

Music 
 Acid Rock
 Groupie Rock
 Hard Rock
 Led Zep
 Punk Rock
 Rock
 Super Rock

Tabloids 
 Hush-Hush News (launched 1968) — same title as 1950s-1960s gossip magazine
 National Mirror (1964–1973)

UFOs 
 Ancient Astronauts
 Clones
 Close Encounters of the Fourth Kind
 ESP
 Official UFO
 Space Trek
 Space Wars
 Star Warp

Misc. 
 Confidential Report / Confidential Sex Report
 GadgetWorld
 Hall of Fame Wrestling
 Official American Horseman
 People Today
 Predictions
 Private Confessions of Doctors and Nurses
 Quick (launched 1964)
 Show Dogs
 True War
 Uncensored — scandal magazine

Notes

References 
 Fass bio, Lambiek's Comiclopedia
 Howlett, Mike. The Weird World of Eerie Publications: Comic Gore That Warped Millions of Young Minds (Feral House, 2010)
 Panucci, Rudy. "Cool Comics: Stuff Your Stocking With Gore!" PopCult (Dec. 1, 2010)

External links 

 "Myron Fass: Man of Mystery," Empire of the Claw
 "Schlock Meister Myron Fass," Pattern Recognition blog

Comic book company founders
Comic book publishers (people)
American magazine publishers (people)
American pulp magazine publishers (people)
1926 births
2006 deaths